Super Naim Experience is the first Stefano Lentini album. Produced in 1999 by Lentini and Laura Polimeno. It is a collection of poems by Emily Dickinson, Samuel Beckett and Federico García Lorca, with original music by Lentini.

The album was released in September 1999 with the collaboration of klezmer musicians from the band Klezroym and the Kurdish percussionist, Mhossen Kassirosafar.

Regarding Super Naim Experience, Lentini said, "I was trying to create a new route for classical Lieder into a popular, folkish way."

Track listing
"E.D." - 5:53
"Ye Mariners All" - 2:53
"Medley 1943/Dieppe/Saint-Lo" - 2:56
"Mrs. Gloom" - 5:35
"Maggio/Trasmundo" - 6:42

Personnel
Production
Paolo Modugno - recording and mixing
Stefano Lentini and Laura Polimeno - producers
Performing artists
Stefano Lentini - acoustic guitars
Laura Polimeno - vocal
Andrea pandolfo - trumpet
Pasquale Laino - saxophone
Mhossen Kassirosafar - daf, zarb

References

Stefano Lentini albums
1999 EPs